Kevin Romone White Jr. (born June 25, 1992) is an American football wide receiver who is a free agent. He played college football at West Virginia. 

A highly-rated prospect coming out of college, White was drafted by the Chicago Bears in the first round of the 2015 NFL Draft with the seventh overall selection. His first three seasons with the Bears were injury plagued, and he was released by the Bears following the 2018 season. He has since been a member of the Arizona Cardinals (2019), San Francisco 49ers (2020), and New Orleans Saints (2021–2022).

High school career
He was born Kevin Romone White Jr. on June 25, 1992. White played high school football at Emmaus High School in Emmaus, Pennsylvania, which competes in the East Penn Conference.

College career
After graduating high school, he attended Lackawanna College for two seasons before attending West Virginia University. In his first season at West Virginia in 2013, he started nine of 11 games and had 35 receptions for 507 yards and five touchdowns. White returned his senior season in 2014 as a starter. He finished the season with 109 receptions for 1,447 yards and 10 touchdowns. He was named an All-American by numerous publications and was a finalist for the Fred Biletnikoff Award.

Statistics

Professional career

White was considered one of the two best wide receivers of the 2015 class, together with Amari Cooper.

Chicago Bears
He was drafted by the Chicago Bears with the seventh overall draft pick in the 2015 NFL Draft. On May 6, 2015, White signed a four-year, $15 million contract with the team.

While participating in the Bears off-season program, White received a minor injury to his shin that held him out of several training camp practices. Shortly after returning, Bears general manager Ryan Pace announced on August 15, 2015, that White had suffered a stress fracture in his shin while participating in organized team activities that would require surgery. On August 23, 2015, White had a steel rod inserted into his left tibia and was placed on the Bears physically unable to perform (PUP) list. White did not play a single game during his rookie season of 2015.

After playing the first four games in the 2016 season, it was announced on October 5, 2016, that White had fractured the fibula in his left leg, the same leg he had injured the year before, and that he has been placed on injured reserve.

White was a starter in the Bears' 2017 season-opener against the Atlanta Falcons. However, he fractured his left shoulder blade in the game. He recorded only two receptions for six yards during the game. White was placed on injured reserve for the third straight year on September 10, 2017.

On May 2, 2018, the Bears declined White's fifth-year option. On October 21, 2018, with the Bears trailing the New England Patriots 38–31 late in the game, White caught a 54-yard Hail Mary pass from quarterback Mitchell Trubisky as time expired. However, he was stopped one yard short, ensuring a Bears loss.

Arizona Cardinals
On March 15, 2019, White signed a one-year contract with the Arizona Cardinals, but was released on August 21, 2019. After sitting out the 2019 NFL season, White had a tryout with the New York Jets on August 20, 2020.

San Francisco 49ers 
White signed with the San Francisco 49ers on August 27, 2020. He was released on September 5, 2020, and signed to the practice squad the next day. He was elevated to the active roster for the team's weeks 5, 6, and 9 games against the Miami Dolphins, Los Angeles Rams, and Green Bay Packers, and reverted to the practice squad after each game. He was placed on the practice squad/COVID-19 list by the team on December 22, 2020, and restored to the practice squad on December 31. He signed a reserve/future contract on January 4, 2021. He was released by the 49ers on August 11, 2021.

New Orleans Saints 
White signed with the New Orleans Saints on August 17, 2021. He was released on August 31, 2021, and re-signed to the practice squad. On October 31, 2021, White made his first reception in three years, for 38 yards against the Tampa Bay Buccaneers from quarterback Trevor Siemian. The Saints went on to win 36-27. He was signed to the active roster on November 13 and released a week later, on November 20. He was again resigned three days later, but released on November 30 and reassigned to the practice squad. He signed a reserve/future contract with the Saints on January 12, 2022.

On August 23, 2022, White was placed on injured reserve. He was released four days later, on August 27. He was re-signed to the practice squad on October 5. White was activated from the practice squad and made his 2022 debut for the Saints on October 20, where he recorded a career-long 64-yard reception in a 42–34 loss to the Arizona Cardinals. He was signed to the active roster on November 7, 2022. He was released on December 5, 2022. He was signed back to the practice squad on December 7, 2022.  His practice squad contract with the team expired after the season on January 8, 2023.

Personal life
White has two younger brothers, Ka'Raun and Kyzir, who both played football at West Virginia. Kyzir is a linebacker who was drafted in the fourth round of the 2018 NFL Draft by the Los Angeles Chargers, where he played for three years before joining then Philadelphia Eagles's 2022 Super Bowl team, and presently playing with the Arizona Cardinals.

References

External links
New Orleans Saints bio 
"Chicago Bears Select WR Kevin White" at 2015 NFL Draft
Emmaus High School highlights
Kevin White on Twitter

1992 births
Living people
American football wide receivers
Arizona Cardinals players
Chicago Bears players
Emmaus High School alumni
Lackawanna Falcons football players
New Orleans Saints players
Players of American football from New Jersey
San Francisco 49ers players
Sportspeople from Lehigh County, Pennsylvania
Sportspeople from Plainfield, New Jersey
West Virginia Mountaineers football players